Christoph Zipf (born 5 December 1962) is a former professional tennis player from Germany.

Biography
A Munich-based right-hander, Zipf was the European Under 18s singles and doubles champion in 1979. He was also a member of the West German team which won the 1981 Galea Cup.

During his professional career he was unable to qualify for the main draw at a Grand Slam tournament, but made two finals on the Grand Prix circuit. He partnered with countryman Hans-Dieter Beutel to finish runner-up at Cologne in 1982. The following year, Zipf reached the singles finals of the 1983 Tel Aviv Open, as an unseeded player. He lost in the final to American Aaron Krickstein.

Zipf represented the West Germany Davis Cup team in three ties, all doubles matches. He helped the West Germans win a World Group Relegation Play-off in the 1981 Davis Cup tournament, over Brazil in São Paulo. He teamed up with Beutel to win the doubles rubber over Marcos Hocevar and Carlos Kirmayr, in a tie which was ultimately won 3–2 in the last reverse singles.

He later worked as a chiropractor and in 1998 treated a back injury for Pete Sampras.

Grand Prix career finals

Singles: 1 (0–1)

Doubles: 1 (0–1)

Challenger titles

Doubles: (2)

See also
List of Germany Davis Cup team representatives

References

External links
 
 
 

1962 births
Living people
West German male tennis players
Tennis players from Frankfurt